Pathmanath Perera (born 4 May 1972 in Kalutara) is a former Sri Lankan cricketer who played first-class and List A cricket from 1991 to 2005.

He captained Kalutara Town Club in their only first-class season in 1996–97.

External links

1972 births
Living people
People from Kalutara
Kalutara Town Club cricketers
Kalutara Physical Culture Centre cricketers
Antonians Sports Club cricketers
Sebastianites Cricket and Athletic Club cricketers
Moratuwa Sports Club cricketers
Panadura Sports Club cricketers
Sri Lankan cricketers